Tamba coeruleobasis is a noctuoid moth in the family Erebidae first described by Lutz W. R. Kobes in 1989.

Characteristics
The medial area of the forewing is broadly unmarked from the irregularly black-bordered blue basal patch to the fine, irregular to zigzag paler fasciae in the marginal zone; these cross a triangular darker area at the apex.

Distribution and habitat
It is found in Borneo, Sumatra, Peninsular Malaysia in the lowlands and hill forests.

References

Erebidae
Boletobiinae
Moths of Borneo
Moths of Malaysia
Moths described in 1989